Millicent Percival (died 2015) was an Antiguan and Barbudan politician and former President of the Senate of Antigua and Barbuda. She served as President of the Senate of Antigua and Barbuda from 21 March 1994 to 26 February 2004. She was also a leading member within the women's groups of the Antigua Trades and Labour Union and the Antigua Labour Party. She was accorded an Official Funeral at the St. George's Anglican Church in Fitches Creek on 11 November 2016.

References

Year of birth missing
2015 deaths
Antigua and Barbuda women in politics
Presidents of the Senate (Antigua and Barbuda)
Antigua and Barbuda Labour Party politicians